Alexandre Grasseli de Souza (born 5 May 1974) is a Brazilian football manager, currently in charge of Cuiabá's under-23 squad.

Managerial career
Born in Cachoeiro de Itapemirim, Espírito Santo, Grasseli was a Physical Education graduate at the Federal University of Viçosa, Minas Gerais. He started working for amateur sides Esporte Clube Montanhês de Ervália and Viçosa Atlético Clube, before joining América Mineiro's youth setup in 2005.

Grasseli subsequently started working at Cruzeiro, being in charge of every squad from the under-15s to the under-20s; in 2011, he was also an assistant manager of the main squad for a brief period. On 8 December of that year, he was named manager of Tupi for the 2012 Campeonato Mineiro, but was sacked the following 6 February after only two matches.

On 3 October 2012, Grasseli was appointed Nacional-MG manager for the 2013 campaign, after being an assistant of Emerson Ávila during the year. On 15 January 2014, he moved abroad after being named at the helm of Angolan club Atlético Petróleos de Luanda.

Back to Brazil in December 2015, Grasseli took over Rio Branco-ES for the 2016 Campeonato Capixaba, but was sacked the following 21 February. For the 2017 season, he was an assistant manager of Caio Autuori (at Anápolis) and Ney Franco (at Sport Recife); he also worked as an interim manager at Anápolis.

Grasseli spent the most of the 2018 season at Vasco da Gama, working as a coordinator of the youth setup. On 29 October of that year, he returned to Cruzeiro, being appointed manager of the under-17s.

On 25 November 2019, Grasseli returned to Vasco after replacing Marcos Valadares at the helm of the under-20s. On 9 October of the following year, he was named interim manager of the first team for the match against Flamengo, in the place of dismissed Ramon Menezes.

Honours
Cruzeiro
Campeonato Brasileiro Sub-20: 2010

References

External links

Futebol de Goyaz profile 

1974 births
Living people
Sportspeople from Espírito Santo
Brazilian football managers
Campeonato Brasileiro Série A managers
Tupi Football Club managers
Rio Branco Atlético Clube managers
Anápolis Futebol Clube managers
CR Vasco da Gama managers
Girabola managers
Atlético Petróleos de Luanda managers
Brazilian expatriate football managers
Brazilian expatriate sportspeople in Angola
Expatriate football managers in Angola